Montecore may refer to:

 Mantacore, a white tiger used by Siegfried & Roy
 "Montecore", a song by Powerwolf from Return in Bloodred
 "Montecore", a song by PVT from Make Me Love You
 Montecore: The Silence of the Tiger, a 2006 novel by Jonas Hassen Khemiri

See also
 Manticore (disambiguation)